Nokia 6122 Classic is a Symbian OS Smartphone similar to the Nokia 6120 Classic. The difference is that the 6122 Classic has a modified shell. It is available exclusively for China Mobile.

6122 Classic